St. Matthew's Episcopal Church is a parish of the Episcopal Church in Houma, Louisiana, in the Episcopal Diocese of Louisiana. It is noted for its historic church at 243 Barrow Street, which was built in 1892 and added to the National Register of Historic Places in 1989.

The parish was chartered in 1855. In 1857, Robert Ruffin Barrow donated five lots on Barrow Street, where the first church was built in 1857. In 1888, fire destroyed the rectory and the church was deemed unsafe, leading to the construction of the current buildings 1890–92.

References

See also
Finding Aid for St. Matthew's Episcopal Church Records, Ellender Memorial Library, Nicholls State University, Thibodaux, La. 
St. Matthew's Episcopal Church website

Episcopal church buildings in Louisiana
Churches on the National Register of Historic Places in Louisiana
Carpenter Gothic church buildings in Louisiana
Churches completed in 1892
Churches in Terrebonne Parish, Louisiana
19th-century Episcopal church buildings
National Register of Historic Places in Terrebonne Parish, Louisiana
1855 establishments in Louisiana
Religious organizations established in 1855